170P/Christensen is a periodic comet in the Solar System. It came to perihelion in September 2014 at about apparent magnitude 18.

References

External links 
 Orbital simulation from JPL (Java) / Horizons Ephemeris
 170P on Seiichi Yoshida's comet list
 Elements and Ephemeris for 170P/Christensen – Minor Planet Center

Periodic comets
0170
170P
20050617